The 15th Directors Guild of America Awards, honoring the outstanding directorial achievements in film and television in 1962, were presented in 1963.

Winners and nominees

Film

Television

External links
 

Directors Guild of America Awards
1962 film awards
1962 television awards
Direct
Direct
1962 awards in the United States